Vernon Scannell (23 January 1922 – 16 November 2007) was a British poet and author. He was at one time a professional boxer, and wrote novels about the sport.

Personal life
Vernon Scannell, whose birth name was John Vernon Bain, was born in 1922 in Spilsby, Lincolnshire. The family, always poor, moved frequently, including Ballaghaderreen in Ireland, Beeston, and Eccles, before settling in Buckinghamshire. Bain spent most of his youth growing up in Aylesbury in Buckinghamshire. His father had fought in the First World War, and came to make a living as a commercial photographer. Scannell attended the local Queen's Park Boys' School, an elementary council school He left school at the age of 14 to work as a clerk in an insurance office. His real passions, however, were for the unlikely combination of boxing and literature. He had been winning boxing titles at school and had been a keen reader from a very early age, although not properly attaching to poetry until about aged 15, when he picked up a Walter de la Mare poem and was "instantly and permanently hooked". He frequently read both the poetry of Thomas Hardy and the thrillers of Edgar Wallace.

Scannell enlisted in the army "as a lark" in 1940, shortly after war was declared. He joined the Argyll and Sutherland Highlanders., and two years later was transferred to the Gordon Highlanders, a part of the 51st Highland Division. The war took him into action in the North African desert. He fought at El Alamein and across the western desert during the Eighth Army's drive to reach Tunisia. Following an assault on an Axis held hill near Gabes he watched as his Gordon Highlanders moved through the recently taken position, looting the dead, both Allied and Axis. Revolted, he walked away. He was caught and court-martialled for deserting a forward area. Sentenced to three years imprisonment, he spent six months in one of the harshest military penal institutions in Alexandria before being released on a suspended sentence to take part in the Normandy landings. His war ended when he was shot in both legs while on night patrol near Caen. He was shipped back to a military hospital at Winwick in Lancashire before being sent on to a convalescent depot. Scannell had always very much disliked army life, finding nothing in his temperament which fitted him for the part of a soldier. Following the end of the war in Europe (V.E. Day) he deserted again and spent two years on the run, earning his living with jobs in the theatre, professional boxing bouts and tutoring and coaching, all the while teaching himself by reading everything he could. During this evasive time Scannell was writing poetry and was first published in Tribune and The Adelphi. He was also boxing for Leeds University, winning the Northern Universities Championships at three weights. In 1947 he was arrested and court-martialled and sent to Northfield Military Hospital, a mental institution near Birmingham. On discharge he returned to Leeds and then went to London, where, supporting himself with teaching jobs and boxing, he settled down to writing.

Scannell, a Fellow of the Royal Society of Literature   won many poetry awards, including for war poems such as his collection Walking Wounded. A. E. Housman said that "the business of poetry is to harmonise the sadness of the universe" and Scannell quoted this with approval. Scannell's poems, with their themes of love, violence and mortality, were shaped and influenced by his wartime experiences. Scannell was awarded a Writing Fellowship in 1975 as Resident Poet in Berinsfield, Oxfordshire, an experience he recounts in A Proper Gentleman and later, in 1979 he spent a term as Poet in Residence at the King's School, Canterbury. His final collection, Last Post, was published in 2007; he had been working on it until not long before his death.

Scannell married the painter Josephine Higson who survives him, along with four of their six children.

Literary life
He received the Heinemann Award for Literature in 1961 for an early poetry volume, The Masks of Love, and the Cholmondeley Award for poetry in 1974. He was elected a Fellow of the Royal Society of Literature in 1960 and granted a Civil List pension in recognition of his services to literature in 1981. Stephen Spender, the poet perceptively wrote to Scannell in a letter in 1953: "you write good poetry and that is all that matters." Seamus Heaney in a letter to Andrew Taylor said he admired Scannell's poems "not only for their sturdy metrical pace and structure, but for their combination of mordancy and a sense of mortality". John Carey, the critic commented: "Scannell nearly always works on two levels, one realistic and external, the other imaginative, metaphorical, haunted by memory and desire. A master of the dramatic monologue, his work is drenched in humanity. It resounds with memories."
Scannell also wrote the verse narration for BBC Television film A House that Died.

He also received a special award from the Wilfred Owen Association "in recognition of his contribution to war poetry". Scannell's best-known book of war poetry is Walking Wounded (1965). The title poem recollects a column of men returning from battle: "No one was suffering from a lethal hurt, They were not magnified by noble wounds, There was no splendour in that company."

Scannell is also the author of a memoir, The Tiger and the Rose (1983). The unadorned narrative covers five years' military service and a brief boxing career. Scannell writes about the conclusion to his army life, "Twenty-five years ago, 1945...was the year I made what might seem like a desperate decision and performed what might appear to be an act of criminal folly, manic selfishness, zany recklessness, abject cowardice or even, perhaps, eccentric courage. I deserted from the Army. The first recipient of the Owen Award, Christopher Logue, author of some of the best war poetry of the past half-century (in the form of versions of the Iliad), spent two years in a military prison, on a charge of handling stolen pass books. What would Owen say? He'd say: Never trust the teller, trust the tale."

Historian Martin Johnes has used Scannell's 1951 novel The Fight to explore racial attitudes in 1950s Britain. He argues that its depictions of reactions to a black boxer illustrate the diversity of racial attitudes, including outright racism, better than contemporary sociological studies where private assumptions and thoughts were hidden.

Death
Scannell spent the final years of his life living in Otley, West Yorkshire, where he died at his home at the age of 85 after a long illness.

Works

Poetry
Graves and Resurrections (1948), poems
The Wound and The Scar (Peter Nevill, 1953)
A Mortal Pitch (Villiers, 1957), poems
The Masks of Love (Putnam, 1960), poems
A Sense of Danger (Putnam, 1962), poems
New Poems 1962: A P. E. N. Anthology (Hutchinson, 1962), editor with Patricia Beer and Ted Hughes
The Dividing Night (Putnam, 1962)
Edward Thomas (1963)
The Loving Game (1965), poems
Walking Wounded – Poems 1962–65 (1965)
Pergamon Poets 8 (1970), with Jon Silkin
Epithets of War – Poems 1965–69 (Eyre & Spottiswoode, 1969)
The Dangerous Ones (Elsevier, 1970)
Mastering the Craft (Pergamon Press, 1970)
Selected Poems (Allison & Busby, 1971)
Company of Women (Sceptre Press, 1971)
Incident at West Bay, a poem (The Keepsake Press, 1972)
The Winter Man (Allison & Busby, 1973)
Wish You Were Here (1973), broadsheet poem
Meeting in Manchester (1974)
The Apple-Raid and Other Poems (Chatto & Windus, 1974)
Three Poets, Two Children: Leonard Clark, Vernon Scannell, Dannie Abse, Answer Questions by Two Children (1975)
A Morden Tower Reading (1976) poems, with Alexis Lykiard
Not Without Glory: Poets of the Second World War (Woburn Press, 1976), editor
Of Love And Music (Mapletree, 1979), poems
Loving Game: Poems (Robson Books, 1979)
New & Collected Poems 1950–1980 (Robson Books, 1980)
Nettles (Robson Books, 1980; as part of New & Collected Poems 1950–1980)
Catch the Light (1982), poems, with Gregory Harrison and Laurence Smith
Winterlude: Poems (Robson Books, 1982)
Funeral Games and Other Poems (Robson Books, 1987)
Sporting Literature (Oxford, 1987), editor, anthology
The Clever Potato – A Feast of Poetry for Children (Red Fox, 1988)
Soldiering On. Poems of Military Life (Robson Books, 1989)
Love Shouts and Whispers (Red Fox, 1990)
A Time for Fires (Robson Books, 1991), poems
Travelling Light (Bodley Head, 1991)
The Black and White Days (Robson Books, 1996), poems
Collected Poems, 1950–93 (Robson Books, 1998)
Feminine Endings (Enitharmon Press, 2000), poems
Views and Distances (Enitharmon Press, 2000), poems
Of Love & War: New and Selected Poems (Robson Books, 2002)
Incendiary
The Gunpowder Plot
House for Sale
Moods of Rain
A Case of Murder poems
Uncle Albert
Hide and Seek
Last Post (Shoestring Press, 2007), 
A Place to Live (The Happy Dragons' Press, 2007)
Death of a Snow Man
They Did Not Expect This
The death of a snowman

Autobiography
The Tiger and the Rose (Hamish Hamilton, 1972)
An Argument of Kings (Parkwest, 1987)
A Proper Gentleman (Robson Books, 1977)
Drums of Morning – Growing up in the Thirties (Robson Books, 1992)

Fiction
The Fight (Peter Nevill, 1953), novel
The Big Chance (John Long, 1960), novel
The Face of the Enemy (Putnam, 1961), novel
The Shadowed Place (1961), novel
The Big Time (Longmans, 1965), novel
Ring of Truth (Robson Books, 1983), novel

Other
How to Enjoy Novels (Piatkus Books, 1984)
How To Enjoy Poetry (Piatkus Books, 1983)
 A House that Died Verse narration to BBC TV film

Further reading
 James Andrew Taylor: Walking Wounded: The Life and Poetry of Vernon Scannell, Oxford: Oxford University Press, 2013,

References

Sources

External links

A sample of Scannell's poetry
Poetry reading on CD by Vernon Scannell
Vernon Scannell on Desert Island Discs 1987
"Vernon Scannell, painter and poet", article in the TLS by Paul Trewhela, 5 December 2007
Obituary in The Times, 20 November 2007
Vernon Scannell at the Poetry Archive
War Poets' Association Entry for Vernon Scannell
Alan Brownjohn, "Vernon Scannell (obituary)", The Guardian, 19 November 2007
"Vernon Scannell (obituary)", The Telegraph, 19 November 2007
Anthony Thwaite, "Vernon Scannell Obituary", The Independent, 19 November 2007
Hazelwood School where Vernon Scannell taught History and Boxing
Simon Jenkins, "Created on a canvas of needless pain: a poet who inspired the underbelly", The Guardian, 23 November 2007
"Vernon Scannell: Teacher" by Barry Fox
 Archival material at 

1922 births
2007 deaths
20th-century English poets
World War II poets
Alumni of the University of Leeds
People from Aylesbury
People from Spilsby
Fellows of the Royal Society of Literature
English male boxers
English male poets
20th-century English male writers
British Army personnel of World War II
Argyll and Sutherland Highlanders soldiers
Gordon Highlanders soldiers
British Army personnel who were court-martialled
Deserters
English prisoners and detainees
Prisoners and detainees of the British military